Anua is a village on Tutuila Island, American Samoa. It is located close to the capital Pago Pago, on the coast of Pago Pago Harbor. The term Pago Pago is often used for several settlements on Pago Pago Bay, including Anua, Lepua, Utulei, and others.

According to the 2010 U.S. Census, Anua was ranked as the village in American Samoa with both the highest per capita income ($34,322) and highest median household income ($131,250). The ratio between female to male residents are 14 percent female and 86 percent male, the largest difference in American Samoa as of the 2000 U.S. Census.

There are several general stores, fast food restaurants, amusement centers, and two gas station located in Anua along the north side of the roadway. These businesses mainly serve the workers at the nearby canneries. StarKist tuna and Samoa Packing are located in the village of Anua. Southwest Marine provides dry-dock facilities to incoming vessels in the Pago Pago Harbor.

History
The new government high school, Poyer School, named after the longest-serving governor, was built on January 23, 1918, in Anua. The school was located at the present location of StarKist. It provided education through grade nine and Mr. David Dykstra was the school's principal. His staff included Nelesoni Uaine and Faato-ia Tufele, who had completed their studies in Hawai'i.

Demographics

References

Villages in American Samoa